Killian Sampson (born 2001) is an Irish hurler who plays for Offaly Championship club Shinrone and at inter-county level with the Offaly senior hurling team. He usually lines out at wing-back.

Career

Sampson first came to hurling prominence at juvenile and underage levels with Shinrone, before eventually joining the club's top adult team. He first appeared on the inter-county scene as vice-captain of the Offaly minor team during the 2018 Leinster Minor Championship, before a three-year stint with the under-20 team which culminated with him being appointed captain in 2020. Sampson was drafted onto the Offaly senior team in advance of the 2021 National Hurling League.

Career statistics

Honours

University of Limerick
Fitzgibbon Cup: 2022

Offaly
Christy Ring Cup: 2021
National Hurling League Division 2A: 2021

References

2000 births
Living people
Shinrone hurlers
Offaly inter-county hurlers